Bemban is a small town in Air Panas Mukim, Jasin District, Malacca, Malaysia.

Economy
 Mydin Hypermarket Bandar Jasin Bestari

Residential neighbourhoods
 Bandar Jasin Bestari

Sports and recreation
 Orna Golf and Country Club - A golf resort owned and managed by Orna Resort Berhad.

Tourist attractions

 Jasin Hot Spring

See also
 Jasin District
 List of cities and towns in Malaysia by population

References

Towns in Malacca
Jasin District